The Women's Super G competition of the Lillehammer 1994 Olympics was held at Kvitfjell.

The defending world champion was Katja Seizinger of Germany, who was also the defending World Cup downhill champion and led the 1994 World Cup.

Results

References 

Women's Super G
Alp
Olymp